Thika District is a former administrative district in the Central Province of Kenya. Its capital town was Thika. The district was adjacent to the northeastern border of Nairobi. The district had a population of 645.713 .

In 2010, the district was eliminated and absorbed into Kiambu County.

The district was predominantly rural, but its urban population was soaring as Nairobi is growing rapidly. Kikuyu were the dominant tribe in the district.

The district had four constituencies: 
Gatanga Constituency (consisted of Gatanga and Kakuzi divisions)
Gatundu South Constituency
Gatundu North Constituency
Juja Constituency (consisted Ruiru, Juja & Thika Town)

External links 
 Research findings – Thika District 
 Gatanga Constituency 

 
Former districts of Kenya